Caius Adrian Lungu (born 2 June 1989) is a Romanian footballer who plays as a right back for Pobeda Stár Bišnov. The first match in the Liga I was played for Voința Sibiu against Astra Ploiești. In his career, Lungu also played for teams such as Fortuna Covaci, CSM Râmnicu Vâlcea or Colorno Calcio.

References

External links

1989 births
Living people
Romanian footballers
Association football defenders
Association football midfielders
Liga I players
Liga II players
CSU Voința Sibiu players
SCM Râmnicu Vâlcea players
FC Ripensia Timișoara players
CSM Reșița players
Eccellenza players
Romanian expatriate footballers
Romanian expatriate sportspeople in Italy
Expatriate footballers in Italy
Sportspeople from Timișoara